Dmitriy Bagryanov (18 December 1967 – 4 February 2015) was a Russian long jumper, best known for his gold medal at the 1992 European Athletics Indoor Championships.

International competitions

References

European Indoor Championships

1967 births
2015 deaths
Russian male long jumpers
Olympic athletes of the Unified Team
Athletes (track and field) at the 1992 Summer Olympics
World Athletics Championships athletes for Russia
World Athletics Indoor Championships winners
Russian Athletics Championships winners
CIS Athletics Championships winners
Soviet Athletics Championships winners